Sargocentron tiere or the blue-lined squirrelfish is one species of Squirrelfish from the Indo-Pacific. It occasionally makes its way into the aquarium trade. It grows to a size of 33 cm in length.

Distribution
This fish is found around the Hawaiian Islands. Its habitat is reef margins and outer reef slopes.

References

 

tiere
Fish of Hawaii
Fish described in 1829
Taxa named by Georges Cuvier